Cult MTL is an English language arts, culture and news website and monthly print publication, based in Montreal, Quebec, Canada. Its first print edition appeared on 7 September 2012. It was created only a few months after Montreal's last English-language alternative weekly, Montreal Mirror, was unceremoniously closed by its parent company, Quebecor.  The founding editors of Cult MTL were also involved with the Mirror. In August 2013 the print version of the magazine was started.

See also
List of magazines in Canada

References

External links

2012 establishments in Quebec
Cultural magazines
Independent magazines
Magazines established in 2012
Magazines published in Montreal
Monthly magazines published in Canada
News magazines published in Canada
Online magazines published in Canada
Visual arts magazines published in Canada